Tom Leigh may refer to:

 Tommy Leigh (footballer, born 1875) (1875–1914), English footballer
 Tommy Leigh (footballer, born 2000), English footballer
 Tom Leigh (RAF officer) (1919–1944), Australian-born airman

See also  
 Thomas Leigh (disambiguation)